Breeze Rapid (stylized as BREEZE Rapid) is a brand of bus service with bus rapid transit characteristics operated by North County Transit District (NCTD) in North County, San Diego.  Its first and only route (350) was introduced in 2011. 

Breeze Rapid Route 350 operates in Escondido, California between Escondido Transit Center and Del Lago Transit Center, primarily along Escondido Boulevard and Bear Valley Parkway. Breeze Rapid enhanced the previous Breeze Route 350 service with dedicated buses, branded stops, and faster, more frequent service.

History
The project was initiated by the San Diego Association of Governments (SANDAG) in June 2005, in cooperation with the City of Escondido and NCTD. The purpose of the project was to identify improvements to a rapid bus connection between the Sprinter at Escondido Transit Center, downtown and south Escondido, the Westfield North County mall, and the  forthcoming MTS Rapid 235. The previous service was prone to bus bunching, heavy boardings near schools on the south end of the route, and traffic congestion in key locations during the morning and evening commute periods.

Service Enhancements
Breeze Rapid Route 350 includes bus stop improvements, queue jump lanes at congested intersections, and transit signal priority. Bus stops were consolidated from 31 stops to 25 stops, and received new benches, shelters and posted route information. Eight bus stops include digital message signs that indicate the next bus arrival, which is provided by using NextBus technology.  Improvements for pedestrian safety, as well as street system modifications to improve local traffic flow, were also made. The six New Flyer C40LF buses that are used on this route (2301-2306) were painted into a special Breeze Rapid livery to distinguish them from the other New Flyer C40LF buses that are in the standard NCTD Breeze livery. 

However, Breeze Rapid Route 350 does not include dedicated right-of-way, off-board fare collection or platform-level boarding.  It does not adhere to the BRT Standard and may be a symptom of BRT Creep.

The cost for the route upgrade was $4,300,000 and the route was projected to have 2,500 riders at opening. Riders save up to 20%, or six minutes, as a result of the improvements.

Future
The Breeze Rapid brand is no longer present on NCTD's web site or Rider's Guide. All six Breeze Rapid buses are retired as of October 28, 2021. Regular Breeze Buses will continue to run on Rapid Route 350 until new Breeze Rapid buses are delivered. 

Future rapid bus services operated by NCTD will also use the Breeze Rapid name. The 2019 SANDAG Regional Transportation Plan proposes a number of rapid bus projects within NCTD's service area:

Breeze Route 101 (Oceanside to Westfield UTC via Highway 101) was also under consideration for rapid conversion as of 2011, but is currently not present in the plan.

See also
Rapid (San Diego)

References

External links
 Official SANDAG web site
 SANDAG.org project details

Bus rapid transit in California
Escondido, California
Rapid transit in California
Public transportation in San Diego County, California